Paul Bracken is a professor of political science and business at Yale University. He received his Bachelor of Science (Engineering) degree from Columbia University and his PhD in Operations Research from Yale University.

Career
The Princeton Review called him one of the United States best 300 professors in 2012.

Publications

Articles
 New Technology and World Order, Lawrence Livermore National Laboratory, in Strategic Latency: Managing the National and International Security: Consequences of Disruptive Technologies (2018).
 The 2018 Nuclear Posture Review: Signaling Restraint with Stipulations, Foreign Policy Research Institute e-note, Issue February 2018 (2018).

Books
 The Second Nuclear Age: Strategy, Danger, and the New Power Politics (2012).
 Managing strategic surprise: lessons from risk management and risk assessment. Paul Bracken, Ian Bremmer and David Gordon (2008).

References 

Living people
American political scientists
Yale School of Management faculty
Columbia School of Engineering and Applied Science alumni
Yale School of Management alumni
Place of birth missing (living people)
People from Ridgefield, Connecticut
RAND Corporation people
Year of birth missing (living people)